Kuchin, feminine: Kuchina is a Russian-language surname. The name is derived from the nickname Kucha (куча, literally: "heap", "pile", a reference to a big man) of the founder of the noble Russian   of Polish descent.

Notable people with this surname include:
Alexander Kuchin (1888–c.1913), Russian oceanographer
Artyom Kuchin (born 1977), Kazakhstani football referee
Mariya Kuchina (born 1993), Russian high jumper

References

Russian-language surnames